Molybdenum trisulfide is an inorganic compound with the formula MoS3.

References

Molybdenum(VI) compounds
Sulfides